North Burial Ground is a historic cemetery located on North Main Street between Brightman and Cory Streets in Fall River, Massachusetts. The cemetery was established in 1810 and added to the National Register of Historic Places in 1983. It is the oldest city-owned cemetery in Fall River.

The cemetery features a fieldstone gatehouse, built about 1890 and an Egyptian Revival receiving tomb built in 1849 from local Fall River granite. After Oak Grove Cemetery opened in 1855, the remains of many were transferred there from North Burial Ground, as it was considered to be the more fashionable resting place.

Notable burials
 Orin Fowler (1791–1852), US Representative.
 James H. "Jim" Manning (1862–1929), MLB player and manager

Gallery

See also
 National Register of Historic Places listings in Fall River, Massachusetts

References

External links
 
 

Cemeteries on the National Register of Historic Places in Massachusetts
Buildings and structures in Fall River, Massachusetts
Cemeteries in Bristol County, Massachusetts
National Register of Historic Places in Fall River, Massachusetts
Cemeteries established in the 1810s
1810 establishments in Massachusetts